Pseudopachys is a genus of mites in the family Pachylaelapidae. This genus has a single species, Pseudopachys parasitizans, found in Europe.

References

Pachylaelapidae
Articles created by Qbugbot